Komagatake Dam  is a gravity dam located in Hokkaido Prefecture in Japan. The dam is used for irrigation. The catchment area of the dam is 48.8 km2. The dam impounds about 25  ha of land when full and can store 3300 thousand cubic meters of water. The construction of the dam was started on 1970 and completed in 1984.

References

Dams in Hokkaido